for the island see Taboga Island

Taboga    is a corregimiento in Taboga District, Panamá Province, Panama with a population of 731 as of 2010. It is the seat of Taboga District. Its population as of 1990 was 1,199; its population as of 2000 was 908.

References

Corregimientos of Panamá Province